Epacris coriacea  is a species of flowering plant in the heath family Ericaceae and is endemic to a eastern New South Wales. It is a slender, erect shrub with hairy branchlets, egg-shaped to more or less diamond-shaped leaves and tube-shaped, white or cream-coloured flowers.

Description

Taxonomy and naming
Epacris coriacea was first formally described in 1839 by Augustin Pyramus de Candolle in his Prodromus Systematis Naturalis Regni Vegetabilis from an unpublished description by Allan Cunningham of plants he collected on the Illawarra escarpment. The specific epithet (coriacea) means "leathery".

Distribution and habitat
This epacris grows on cliffs and in rock crevices from the Woronora Plateau to near Rylstone in eastern New South Wales.

References

coriacea
Ericales of Australia
Flora of New South Wales
Plants described in 1839
Taxa named by Augustin Pyramus de Candolle